Bernard Manana (born 13 May 1972) is a former Papua New Guinean sprinter who competed in the men's 100m competition at the 1992 Summer Olympics. He recorded an 11.35, not enough to qualify for the next round past the heats. His personal best is 10.90, set in 1991. He was also a part of his country's 4 × 400 m relay team which finished 6th in their heat with a time of 3:13.35

References

External links

1972 births
Living people
Papua New Guinean male sprinters
Athletes (track and field) at the 1992 Summer Olympics
Olympic athletes of Papua New Guinea